St. George's Monastery is an ancient Orthodox monastery in Demë, near Sarandë, Sarandë. It is a Cultural Monument of Albania.

References

Cultural Monuments of Albania
Buildings and structures in Sarandë